Wallaroo  is a common name for several species of moderately large macropods, intermediate in size between the kangaroos and the wallabies. The word "wallaroo" is from the Dharug walaru, and not a portmanteau of the words "kangaroo" and "wallaby", as is commonly assumed.

Description 
Wallaroos are typically distinct species from kangaroos and wallabies. An exception is the antilopine wallaroo, which is commonly  known as an antilopine kangaroo when large, an antilopine wallaby (when small), or an antilopine wallaroo when of intermediate size.

Species 
Wallaroo may refer to one of several species in the genus Osphranter:

 The common wallaroo or wallaroo (Osphranter robustus) is the best-known species. There are four subspecies of the common wallaroo: the eastern wallaroo (O. r. robustus) and the euro (O. r. erubescens), which are both widespread, and two of more restricted range, one from Barrow Island (the Barrow Island wallaroo (O. r. isabellinus)), the other from the Kimberley region (the Kimberley wallaroo (O. r. woodwardi)).
 The black wallaroo (O. bernardus) occupies an area of steep, rocky ground in Arnhem Land. Because it is very wary and is found only in a small area of remote and very rugged country, it is little-known.
 The antilopine wallaroo (O. antilopinus), also known as the antilopine kangaroo or the antilopine wallaby, is a creature of the grassy plains and woodlands and is gregarious, unlike  other wallaroos which are solitary.

References

External links

Macropods
Marsupials of Australia
Australian Aboriginal words and phrases
Mammal common names